Brian Winter (born 21 January 1968) is a Scottish former football referee.

In September 2010 he had to be talked out of quitting as a referee after he failed to send off Steven Anderson despite showing two yellow cards to the player in the space of 12 minutes.

He retired in 2012 due to injury, a short time after taking charge of one of his highest-profile appointments, the 2012 Scottish Challenge Cup Final. He was appointed as a 'referee observer' by the Scottish Football Association a few months following his retirement. In 2017, he was given responsibility for overseeing officials in the Lanarkshire and Stirlingshire regions.

His son Andy Winter is a footballer who began his career with Hamilton Academical.

References

External links
 
 

1968 births
Living people
Scottish football referees
Scottish Football League referees
Scottish Premier League referees